Bački Sokolac is a village in Serbia. It is situated in the Bačka Topola municipality, in the North Bačka District, Vojvodina province. The village has a Serb ethnic majority and its population numbering 609 people (2002 census).

Historical population

1961: 1,051
1971: 1,108
1981: 525
1991: 497
2002: 609

See also
List of places in Serbia
List of cities, towns and villages in Vojvodina

References
Slobodan Ćurčić, Broj stanovnika Vojvodine, Novi Sad, 1996.

Places in Bačka